Soulville is a 1957 album by swing tenor saxophonist Ben Webster, recording a session from October 15, 1957, which Webster played with the Oscar Peterson Trio.

Reception
This session is described by AllMusic as "one of the highlights" of Webster's "golden '50s run". The album was reissued in the early 1990s on CD with three bonus tracks, which include rare recordings of Webster playing piano. When it was remastered in 24-bit for a 2003 edition, additional photographs and new liner notes were also included.

Track listing
"Soulville" (Ben Webster) – 8:03
"Late Date" (Webster) – 7:13
"Time on My Hands" (Harold Adamson, Mack Gordon, Vincent Youmans) – 4:16
"Lover, Come Back to Me" (Oscar Hammerstein II, Sigmund Romberg) – 8:26
"Where Are You?" (Lew Pollack, Lou Davis) – 4:41
"Makin' Whoopee" (Walter Donaldson, Gus Kahn) – 4:29
"Ill Wind (Harold Arlen, Ted Koehler) – 3:30

Bonus tracks
"Who?" (Hammerstein, Otto Harbach, Jerome Kern) – 2:56
"Boogie Woogie" (Webster) – 3:06
"Roses of Picardy" (Frederick E. Weatherly, Haydn Wood) – 2:05

Personnel

Performance
Ray Brown – bass
Herb Ellis – guitar
Stan Levey – drums 
Oscar Peterson – piano 
Ben Webster – tenor saxophone, piano on the bonus tracks

Production
Norman Granz – producer 
Nat Hentoff – original liner notes 
Ellie Hughes – design 
Tom Hughes – design 
Seth Rothstein – CD preparation 
Tom "Curly" Ruff – digital remastering 
Phil Schaap – re-issue liner notes 
Richard Seidel – CD preparation 
Phil Stern – photography

References

External links 
 

Ben Webster albums
1957 albums
Albums produced by Norman Granz
Verve Records albums